Anthony Whiting better known as Ant Whiting is a British songwriter, multi-instrumentalist, and producer signed to Sony/ATV Music Publishing. He has worked as a producer and songwriter with artists such as John Newman and Rizzle Kicks.

Biography
Whiting began his production and writing career with two tracks on MIA's debut album Arular, including the singles "Fire Fire" & "Bingo." Since then Whiting has co-written & produced for a number of established artists, his biggest success to date has been with Rizzle Kicks as the main co-writer and producer on the platinum selling UK No. 5 album Stereo Typical, where he delivered six tracks including two singles "Traveller's Chant" and "Dreamer's." Whiting worked with Rizzle Kicks writing for their follow up album (Roaring 20s) out September 2013, where he wrote & produced the majority of their album alongside producer Norman Cook.

Further releases in 2013 included cuts with Devlin (Island) and Chlöe Howl (Columbia), tracks for Ella Eyre (Virgin), and co-writing with Willy Moon (Island). He also produced the John Newman debut album Tribute, which peaked at No. 1 on the UK album charts. He also worked on the debut by Becky Hill.

Discography

Credits

Remixes

See also
List of songwriters

References

External links
 
Ant Whiting at Allmusic
Ant Whiting at Discogs

British record producers
British songwriters
Year of birth missing (living people)
Place of birth missing (living people)
Living people